Nikolay Storonsky (born 21 July 1984) is a British businessman of Russian origin. He is the co-founder and CEO of the financial technology company Revolut.

Storonsky was born into the family of a senior Gazprom manager. His father, Nikolay Mironovich Storonsky, was born in Ukraine and has been Deputy General Director of Science for natural gas research institute Gazprom Promgaz since 2017, and First Deputy General Director for Science Gazprom Promgaz OAO. Storonsky studied for a master's degree in physics at the Moscow Institute of Physics and Technology, and during this time became a state champion swimmer. He completed a separate masters in economics at New Economic School in Moscow. Later he worked as a trader at Lehman Brothers and Credit Suisse. He left the banking industry to found digital-only banking app Revolut. In 2021, Revolut became the biggest fintech firm in the United Kingdom.

At the age of 20, Storonsky emigrated to the United Kingdom and acquired British citizenship. In 2022, he condemned the Russian invasion of Ukraine. He renounced Russian citizenship in October 2022.

Storonsky made the 2022 Forbes Billionaires List with an estimated wealth of $7.1 billion and occupied the 336th position. Welp Magazine also named him in the following lists: '101 UK Founder & CEO’s To Follow in 2022' and '101 UK CEO’s To Follow in 2022'.

Storonsky has a wife and two daughters.

References 

1984 births
Moscow Institute of Physics and Technology alumni
New Economic School alumni
Living people
British businesspeople
British billionaires
20th-century British businesspeople
21st-century British businesspeople
Russian emigrants to the United Kingdom
Russian businesspeople in the United Kingdom
Russian activists against the 2022 Russian invasion of Ukraine
People who lost Russian citizenship